Rugby union in Iran is a growing sport.

The Iran Rugby Federation was formed by Alireza Fazlollah A’rabi in 2000 as a part of Baseball Federation of the Islamic Republic of Iran. Iran became a fully fledged member of the International Rugby Board in November 2010.

History
Rugby union was first introduced into Persia by the British military, and it was not uncommon for rich Persians to send their children to British boarding schools.

In more recent times, it has grown through university contacts and has now grown to over 1,000 players, both men and women.

The first step for formalization of rugby football in Iran was performed in 1996 when a professor of Physical Education University decided to teach rugby football for students who attended to physical training lessen. He tried to explain it to students briefly using a reference book on sport sciences.  Accordingly, he introduced rugby football to students using above-mentioned book and soccer ball instead of oval-form ball of rugby football. 
A talent and interested student called Alireza Fazlollah A’rabi was between students. After lessen he began his study on rugby football. During his research he met a retired from Iranian army and found out that rugby football was first played in Iran by oil contractors in Masjed-Soleyman city during the 1940s and some personal sport clubs attempted to create rugby football team. Unfortunately, rugby football was practically cancelled due to lack of enough support by authorities and sport poor condition during the 1950s in Iran.

Alireza continued his research to learn technical information and rules about rugby football. He introduced rugby football as new plan for Physical Education Organization when he established a university team including postgraduate students in the field of physical education and technology. 
He proposed the project of rugby football in Iran as national plan to Physical Education Organization after one year continuous work and study in 2000 and finally at 2001 he received license to formalize this sport as field covered by Baseball Federation which already covered cricket, softball and baseball too. It is important to remind that all costs related to this sport in Iran such as team handling, research, training courses and competitions were paid by those interested and sportsmen in this field before formalization of this sport in Iran.

After some years continuous efforts made by society of Iran rugby football together with authorities, today we can see successful results such as foundation of Iran Rugby Football Union, qualification for Asian competitions and membership in Asian Rugby Football Union (ARFU) with optimal rank in this Union. We hope that Iranian rugby football could be member of International Rugby Board and receive optimal international rank based on all efforts made by authorities as well as all supports made by IRB.
http://iranrugby.com/

Notable players of Iranian descent
 Aadel Kardooni, an Iranian who emigrated to the England in the 1980s played for Leicester Tigers and represented England A. He was the first Asian to ever play professionally in Europe.
Josh Navidi is the most prominent player of Iranian descent. A professional for Cardiff Blues and a Welsh international, he is the Welsh-born son of an Iranian father and Welsh mother.
Mohammadali Esteki  is an Iranian professional rugby player who plays in the Italian top league

National team

The national team currently competes in Division 2 of the 2012 Asian Five Nations alongside Malaysia, China and Thailand.

It has been announced that Iran will be participating in the rugby sevens tournament at the 2010 Asian Games.

Domestic competitions

Iranian League
The Iranian League is an amateur league which was established in 2002 by Alireza Fazlollah A’rabi He presented the Rugby field to the Physical Education Organization of IRAN in 2000

The national league consists of 10 teams, which is played in two separate groups. For the 2010-11 season, In Group 1 will be played out by Gas Khorasan, Shahrdari Tabriz, Setaregan, Khuzestan and Persian Gulf. Group 2 will be played out by Golestan, Kermanshah, Qom, Gilan and Congress 60.

See also
Sport in Iran
Iran national rugby union team
Iran national rugby sevens team
Iran women's national rugby union team (sevens)

References

External links
Official union page
Iran Rugby
"Islam and Rugby" on the Rugby Readers review